Veselov is a surname. Notable people with the surname include:

Jury Veselov (born 1982), Russian luger
Kirill Veselov, Russian ski-orienteer
Vitali Veselov (born 1973), Russian footballer

See also
7457 Veselov, main-belt asteroid
Novikov–Veselov equation

Russian-language surnames